Apatelodes heptaloba is a moth in the family Apatelodidae first described by Herbert Druce in 1887. It is found in Guatemala.

References

Apatelodidae
Moths described in 1887